The 2023 Bowling Green Falcons football team will represent Bowling Green State University during the 2023 NCAA Division I FBS football season. The Falcons are led by fifth-year head coach Scot Loeffler and play their home games at Doyt Perry Stadium in Bowling Green, Ohio. They compete as members of the East Division of the Mid-American Conference (MAC).

Previous season

The Falcons finished the 2022 season 6–7 and 5–3 in the MAC to finish tied for second place in the East Division.  They lost the Quick Lane Bowl to New Mexico State.

Schedule

References

Bowling Green
Bowling Green Falcons football seasons
Bowling Green Falcons football